The 1993–94 New York Rangers season was the franchise's 68th season. The highlight of the season was winning the Stanley Cup and hosting the NHL All-Star Game at Madison Square Garden. The Rangers clinched their second Presidents' Trophy and sixth division title by finishing with the best record in the NHL at 52–24–8, setting a then-franchise record with 112 points.

This marked the last season in which the Rangers were under the control of Paramount Communications. Toward the end of the season, Paramount was taken over by Viacom. Shortly thereafter, Viacom divested itself of all of Paramount's interests in Madison Square Garden, including the Rangers, and sold them to ITT Corporation and Cablevision. A couple of years later, ITT would sell their share to Cablevision, who owned the Rangers until 2010, when the MSG properties became their own company.

Off season 

On April 17, 1993, the New York Rangers named Mike Keenan as their head coach. Keenan was hired to replace Ron Smith, who the team decided not to retain after he coached the second half of the season in place of the fired Roger Neilson. Keenan had taken the 1992–93 season off after spending four years as the head coach of the Chicago Blackhawks, where he led the team to the Stanley Cup Finals in his last year.

Pre-season 
During the 1993 pre-season, the Rangers had a record of 7–2–0.

Regular season 
The 1993–94 season was a magical one for Rangers fans, as head coach Mike Keenan led the Rangers to their first Stanley Cup championship in 54 years. Two years prior, they acquired center Mark Messier, who was an integral part of the Edmonton Oilers' Cup-winning teams. Adam Graves, who also defected from the Oilers, joined the Rangers as well. Other ex-Oilers on the Blueshirts included trade deadline acquisitions Craig MacTavish and Glenn Anderson. Brian Leetch and Sergei Zubov were a solid "1–2 punch" on defense. In fact, Zubov led the team in scoring that season with 89 points, and continued to be an All-Star defenseman throughout his career. Graves would set a team record with 52 goals, breaking the old record of 50 held by Vic Hadfield. This record would later be broken by Jaromir Jagr on April 8, 2006, against the Boston Bruins. New York was not shut-out in any of their 84 regular-season games. The Rangers led the NHL in wins (52), points (112) and power-play goals (96, tied with the Buffalo Sabres) and power play percentage (23.02%). They also allowed the fewest shorthanded goals (5) of all 26 teams.

On February 21, 1994, Tony Amonte scored just eight seconds into the overtime period to win the game to give the Rangers a 4–3 home win over the Pittsburgh Penguins. It would prove to be the fastest overtime goal scored during the 1993–94 regular season.

All-Star Game 
The 1994 National Hockey League All-Star Game took place on January 22, 1994, at Madison Square Garden in New York City. The final score was East 9, West 8.

Season standings

Playoffs

Eastern Conference Quarterfinals 
In the opening round, the Rangers faced their crosstown rivals the New York Islanders, this series would turn out to be an extremely one sided affair as the Rangers outscored their rivals 22–3 in a four-game sweep.

Eastern Conference Semi-finals 
Next, the Rangers faced the Washington Capitals who were coming off a shocking six game win over the second seeded Pittsburgh Penguins. The Rangers appeared to have the series in hand after they won the first three games, although the Capitals avoided the sweep with a Game 4 win, the Rangers got back in control and won the series in five games.

Eastern Conference Finals 
After going down in the Eastern Conference Finals 3–2 to the New Jersey Devils, Rangers' captain Mark Messier made one of the most famous guarantees in sports history, saying the Rangers would win Game 6 in New Jersey to tie the series 3–3. Not only did the Rangers back up Messier's guarantee, Messier scored a hat-trick in the Rangers' 4–2 win, sending the game back to New York for Game 7. In Game 7, the Rangers held a 1–0 lead after a second period goal by Brian Leetch. The lead would hold up until 7.7 seconds remaining, when Valeri Zelepukin was able to beat Mike Richter to send the game to overtime. In double overtime, Stephane Matteau scored his second overtime goal of the series to send the Rangers to the Finals. The series-winning goal prompted the famous call of "Matteau, Matteau, Matteau!" by Rangers radio announcer Howie Rose.

Stanley Cup Finals 

The Rangers winning this Stanley Cup drew 4.957 million viewers to Hockey Night in Canada, making it the highest-rated single CBC Sports program in history until the 10.6 million viewers for the men's ice hockey gold medal game between Canada and the United States at the 2002 Winter Olympics, when Canada won its first Olympic ice hockey gold medal since the 1952 Winter Olympics. CBC commentator Bob Cole said Game 7 was one of his most memorable TV games.

MSG Network broadcaster Al Trautwig said that this Stanley Cup win by the Rangers was seen as the coming of age of the NHL's influence in Europe. It marked the first time that the Russians got their names on the Stanley Cup and there were four who got that honor – Alexander Karpovtsev, Alexei Kovalev, Sergei Nemchinov and Sergei Zubov—giving a huge European television audience, including those watching on the brand-new television screens across the former Soviet Union, a Stanley Cup story to remember.

Schedule and results

Pre-season

Regular season 

Detailed records

Playoffs 

All times are EASTERN time

Player statistics 
Skaters

Goaltenders

†Denotes player spent time with another team before joining Rangers. Stats reflect time with Rangers only.
‡Traded mid-season. Stats reflect time with Rangers only.

Media 
Ranger games were carried on the MSG Network, with some games broadcast on MSG II due to conflicts with New York Knicks National Basketball Association and New York Yankees Major League Baseball games. The broadcast crew included Sam Rosen, Bruce Beck, John Davidson, and Al Trautwig.

The games were also broadcast on radio station WFAN-AM; the broadcast team included Marv Albert, Howie Rose, Sal Messina, and Steve Somers. Some games were broadcast on WEVD-AM due to conflicts with New York Knicks National Basketball Association games and New York Jets National Football League games.

Transactions 
 June 25, 1993: Doug Lidster was traded by the Vancouver Canucks to the New York Rangers in exchange for John Vanbiesbrouck.
 November 2, 1993: Nick Kypreos traded from Hartford Whalers with Barry Richter, Steve Larmer and round 6 pick in the 1994 NHL Entry Draft (Yuri Litvinov) to New York Rangers for Darren Turcotte and James Patrick.
 March 21, 1994:
 Phil Bourque traded from NY Rangers to Ottawa for future considerations.
 Tony Amonte and the rights to Matt Oates traded from NY Rangers to Chicago for Stephane Matteau and Brian Noonan.
 Peter Andersson traded from NY Rangers to Florida for future considerations.
 Mike Gartner traded from NY Rangers to Toronto for Glenn Anderson, the rights to Scott Malone and Toronto's 4th round pick in 1994 Entry Draft.
 Craig MacTavish traded from Edmonton to NY Rangers for Todd Marchant.

Awards and records 
 Brian Leetch, Conn Smythe Trophy
 Most wins by goaltender, season – Mike Richter (1993–94) – 42
 Mike Richter, MVP of 45th NHL All-Star Game

45th NHL All-Star Game 
New York Rangers NHL All-Star representatives at the 45th NHL All-Star Game in New York City, New York at Madison Square Garden.

Players

Goaltenders

Trainers

Draft picks 
New York's picks at the 1993 NHL Entry Draft in Quebec City, Quebec, Canada, at the Colisée de Québec.

Expansion Draft 
New York's losses at the 1993 NHL Expansion Draft in Quebec City, Quebec.

Supplemental Draft 
New York's picks at the 1993 NHL Supplemental Draft.

References 

Bibliography

External links 
 Rangers on Hockey Database

New York Rangers seasons
New York Rangers
New York Rangers
New York Rangers
New York Rangers
1990s in Manhattan
New York Rangers
Eastern Conference (NHL) championship seasons
Madison Square Garden
National Hockey League All-Star Game hosts
Presidents' Trophy seasons
Stanley Cup championship seasons